Mimacronia decimaculata is a species of beetle in the family Cerambycidae. It was described by Schultze in 1919, originally under the genus Acronia. It is known from the Philippines.

References

Pteropliini
Beetles described in 1919